John Maxwell "Jack" Bowman (24 May 1925, Winnipeg – 22 May 2005, Winnipeg) was a Canadian pediatrician, medical researcher, and professor of medicine. He was an internationally recognized expert in the treatment and prevention of Rh disease in newborns.

Biography
After secondary education at Gordon Bell High School, Bowman studied medicine at the University of Manitoba Medical College with M.D. in 1949. After serving his medical internship at Winnipeg General Hospital, he spent two years in rural general practice in Oakville, Manitoba. He then trained as a pediatrician at the Children's Hospital of Winnipeg, at the Winnipeg General Hospital’s Newborn Service and Rh Laboratory, and at the Babies Hospital of Columbia Presbyterian Medical Center. He became a certified pediatrician in 1956 and then from 1956 to 1957 studied and lectured in clinical pediatrics at Queen’s University in Kingston, Ontario. In 1957 he joined his identical twin brother William David "Bill" Bowman (1925–2011) in the pediatric department of the Manitoba Medical Clinic. In 1957 J. M. Bowman began working as a part-time associate with Bruce Chown and Marion Lewis at Winnipeg's Rh Laboratory and as a part-time member of the University of Manitoba's pediatric department.

From 1961 to 1996 Jack Bowman was the Rh Laboratory's medical director. In 1967 he resigned from the Manitoba Medical Clinic to become a full professor in the University of Manitoba's pediatric department, holding the professorship until his retirement in 1996. He also served until 1982 as the medical director of the Manitoba Red Cross Blood Services.

He was one of the main contributors to Cangene Corporation's development and licensing in Canada in 1980 of WinRho, in which "Win" represents Winnipeg. He was an active lecturer during his retirement and gave his last lecture 3 days before his death.

Upon his death he was survived by three daughters, a son, and eight grandchildren. He was predeceased by his wife, a son, and a granddaughter.

Awards and honours
 1977 — Queen Elizabeth II Silver Jubilee Medal
 1983 — Officer of the Order of Canada
 1986 — Fellow of the Royal Society of Canada
 1996 — Provost in the Manitoba Order of the Buffalo Hunt
 1996 — F.N.G. Starr Award
 2001 — Karl Landsteiner Memorial Award

Selection publications
 with Janet M. Pollock: 
 with Janet M. Pollock, Frank A. Manning, Chris R. Harman, and Savas Menticoglou: 
 with V. de Almeida:

References

1925 births
2005 deaths
University of Manitoba alumni
Academic staff of the University of Manitoba
Canadian pediatricians
Fellows of the Royal Society of Canada
Officers of the Order of Canada
People from Winnipeg